This is a list of wars involving the Republic of Zimbabwe.

References

 
Zimbabwe
Wars